The Annual Ukulele Festival was held each July in Hawaii from 1971 to 2022. It was founded in 1971 by Roy Sakuma with the support of the Waikiki Department of Parks. The event drew large crowds to listen to free concerts by both amateur and top ukulele musicians.

Origins
In 1970, Roy Sakuma was working as a groundskeeper for the Waikiki Department of Parks. At lunch one day, Sakuma and his colleagues envisioned an ukulele concert. With the support of his supervisor, Sakuma worked with the department and the Hawaii International Ukulele Club to put together the first festival at the Kapiolani Park Bandstand in Waikiki in 1971.

Ukulele Festival Hawaii organization
Ukulele Festival Hawaii is a non-profit charitable organization established in 2004 by Roy and Kathy Sakuma. The organization’s mission is to bring laughter, love and hope to children and adults throughout Hawaii and the world through the music of the ukulele. Ukulele Festival Hawaii produces, promotes and arranges ukulele festivals free to the public, encourages interest in Hawaii’s arts and culture through education and scholarships, and promotes local and international interest in the ukulele as an instrument of virtuoso quality. The Ukulele Festival, the first and original ‘ukulele festival begun in 1971, is held every July in Kapiolani Park, O‘ahu.

Key performers
In 1985, Sakuma went looking for the man who had created two ukulele jazz records 25 years earlier that had become classics to the Hawaiian ukulele players, How About Uke? and 50th State Jazz. Sakuma located Lyle Ritz in California and convinced him to pick up the ukulele again and come play at the festival that year. Ritz then moved to Hawaii and performed at many of the following festivals as well.

In 1994, James Ingram, the Grammy Award-winning pop artist, met Sakuma while they were exercising on the tracks of the University of Hawaii. Ten years later the two composed “Come and Join Us” which has become the theme song for Ukulele Festival Hawaii organization. The 2004 Hawaii Music Awards awarded the “Single of the Year" to the composition.

Master of Ceremonies
Danny Kaleikini served as the festival’s official emcee for over 45 years, first appearing in 1972. Kaleikini often serves as emcee at the other ukulele festivals as well.

Festival Dates and Headliners

References

Ukuleles
Waikiki
Tourist attractions in Honolulu
Festivals in Hawaii
Music festivals in Hawaii
Music festivals established in 1971
Recurring events disestablished in 2022
Annual events in Hawaii
1971 establishments in Hawaii
2022 disestablishments in Hawaii